Monty Bryson Montgomery (born September 1, 1946) is an American former professional baseball right-handed pitcher, who played in Major League Baseball (MLB) for the Kansas City Royals, appearing in 12 games, in  and .

Montgomery was drafted by the Royals in the ninth round of the 1968 Major League Baseball draft out of Pfeiffer University.  Recalled from the minor leagues by Kansas City in September 1971, he appeared in three games, two as a starting pitcher, in the season's final weeks — and won all three of them. In 1972, Montgomery started and finished the season in the big leagues, while playing most of the campaign for the Triple-A Omaha Royals. However, on September 7, 1972, he threw his only MLB complete game shutout, a four-hit, 6–0 blanking of the California Angels at Municipal Stadium.

Altogether, in Montgomery’s brief major league career, he logged 12 games (ten of them as a starter), and won six of nine decisions, allowing 71 hits, and 20 bases on balls, with 36 strikeouts, in 77 innings pitched.

References

External links

Pelota Binaria (Venezuelan Winter League)

1946 births
Living people
Baseball players from North Carolina
Cardenales de Lara players
American expatriate baseball players in Venezuela
Elmira Pioneers players
Florida Instructional League Royals players
High Point-Thomasville Hi-Toms players
High Point-Thomasville Royals players
Jacksonville Suns players
Kansas City Royals players
Major League Baseball pitchers
Omaha Royals players
People from Albemarle, North Carolina
Pfeiffer Falcons baseball players